Vera Looser (née Adrian; born 28 October 1993) is a Namibian road cyclist and mountain biker who most recently rode for UCI Women's Continental Team . She represented her nation at the 2014 and 2018 Commonwealth Games and at the 2016 Summer Olympics. She has won the Namibian National Time Trial Championships on seven occasions, and the Namibian National Road Race Championships on ten occasions, including nine years consecutively between 2014 and 2022.

Major results 

2012
 National Road Championships
1st  Road race
1st  Time trial
 African Road Championships
3rd  Road race
7th Time trial
2013
 African Road Championships
2nd  Road race
3rd  Time trial
2014
 National Road Championships
1st  Road race
2nd Time trial
2015
 National Road Championships
1st  Road race
1st  Time trial
 African Road Championships
2nd  Team time trial
5th Time trial
9th Road race
 African Games
4th Team time trial
5th Time trial
8th Road race
2016
 African Road Championships
1st  Road race
1st  Time trial
 National Road Championships
1st  Road race
1st  Time trial
 4th KZN Summer Series 2
 4th Steinmaur
2017
 National Road Championships
1st  Road race
1st  Time trial
 1st Grand Prix Olten
 2nd GP Oberbaselbiet
 4th Lakuntz
 4th Emptinne
 7th 947 Cycle Challenge
2018
 National Road Championships
1st  Road race
2nd Time trial
 4th SwissEver GP Cham-Hagendorn
 African Road Championships
6th Time trial
7th Road race
2019
 National Road Championships
1st  Road race
1st  Time trial
 African Games
3rd  Road race
3rd  Time trial
 African Road Championships
5th Road race
6th Time trial
2020
 1st  Road race, National Road Championships
2021
 National Road Championships
1st  Road race
1st  Time trial
 African Road Championships
3rd  Road race
3rd  Time trial
2022
 National Road Championships
1st  Road race
1st  Time trial

References

External links 
 
 

1993 births
Namibian female cyclists
Living people
Sportspeople from Windhoek
White Namibian people
Place of birth missing (living people)
Cyclists at the 2014 Commonwealth Games
Cyclists at the 2018 Commonwealth Games
Commonwealth Games competitors for Namibia
Cyclists at the 2016 Summer Olympics
Cyclists at the 2020 Summer Olympics
Olympic cyclists of Namibia
Competitors at the 2019 African Games
African Games medalists in cycling
African Games bronze medalists for Namibia
20th-century Namibian women
21st-century Namibian women